Jakubinskij's law, or Meyer–Jakubinskij's law, is a sound law that operated in the Croatian Chakavian dialect in the 12th–13th century, named after Lav Jakubinski who discovered it in 1925, and sometimes also after K. H. Meyer who expanded and refined the rule in 1926.

Jakubinskij's law governs the distribution of the mixed Ikavian–Ekavian reflexes of Common Slavic yat phoneme, occurring in the Middle Chakavian area.

In the Southern Chakavian Ikavian area, yat */ě/ was reflected as /i/, and became merged with the reflexes of Common Slavic */y/ and */i/. In the northwest, however, according to the Meyer–Jakubinskij's law, */ě/ > /e/ before dental consonants {d, t, s, z, n, l, r} which were followed by one of the back vowels {a, o, u, y, ъ}, and elsewhere */ě/ > /i/. This /e/ has thus merged the reflexes of Common Slavic */e/ and */ę/.

Compare tȇlo 'body' as opposed to bīžéć 'fleeing'.

The effect of Jakubinskij's rule has been levelled out in paradigmatic alternations and derivational morphology, by the analogical influence of nominative form onto the oblique cases, infinitive on other verbal forms, word stem onto derivations etc. Thus no or extremely little alternation occurs throughout the inflectional paradigm. For example, Common Slavic *město 'place, position' would yield N sg mesto, but L pl is mestih, not **mistih. L sg of mera (< Comm Slavic *měra 'measure') is meri not **miri etc.

Though initially applied only to Chakavian Ikavian–Ekavian accents, this rule is also valid for some Kajkavian Ikavian–Ekavian accents of Duga Resa, Ogulin, Karlovac and Žumberak.

In Popular Culture
In 2023, the webcomic Saturday Morning Breakfast Cereal poked fun at Jakubinskij's Law, implying a pronunciation pattern in a defunct dialect doesn't deserve a named scientific law.

Notes

References 
 
 Lav Jakubinskij (1925). Die Vertretung des urslav. ě im Čakavischen. Zeitschrift für slavische Philologie 1, pp. 381–396
 K.H. Meyer (1926). Beiträge zum Čakavischen. Archiv für slavische Philologie 40, pp. 222–265

Croatian language
Sound laws